The Calgary municipal railway operated a system of streetcar routes in Calgary, Alberta, from 1909, until 1950.
From 1909 to 1910 the system was named the "Calgary Electric Railway".

In 1909, and early 1910, the system was known as the "Calgary electric railway".
In 1946, the system was renamed the "Calgary Transit System", to reflect the decision that all the streetcars routes were to be replaced with electric trolley buses.

The Calgary Stampede grounds were the terminus of the first streetcar route.

According to Maxwell Foran and Charles Reasons, streetcars were built to working-class neighbourhoods, enabling workers to get to their workplaces, while those neighbourhoods were underserved by water and electric utilities.

Routes

 14th Street SW

References

External links

Rail transport in Alberta
Transport in Calgary
Streetcars in Canada
Defunct Alberta railways
Calgary
Electric railways in Canada
Street railways in Alberta